The Western Polynesian tropical moist forests is a tropical and subtropical moist broadleaf forests ecoregion in Polynesia. It includes Tuvalu, the Phoenix Islands in Kiribati, Tokelau, and Howland and Baker islands, which are possessions of the United States.

Geography
The islands are mostly atolls, low islands of coralline sand ringing a central lagoon, or raised platforms of coralline limestone. The ecoregion includes three archipelagos along with some scattered islands.

Tuvalu, formerly known as the Ellice Islands, includes nine atolls between 6º to 9º S latitude and 176º to 180º E longitude.

The Phoenix Islands include eight atolls between 2º to 5º S latitude and 171º to 175º W longitude. They are part of Kiribati, and mostly uninhabited.

Tokelau includes three inhabited atolls, Atafu, Nukunonu, and Fakaofo, and uninhabited Swain's Island, which is disputed with American Samoa. Tokelau lies between 8º to 12º S latitude and 170º to 173º W longitude.

Howland and Baker islands lie north of the Phoenix Islands.

Climate
The climate of the islands is tropical, with little seasonal variation in temperature.
Tuvalu and Tokelau are in the trade wind belt, and average annual rainfall ranges 1,500 to 3,500 mm, falling relatively consistently from month to month and year to year.

Most of the Phoenix Islands and Howland and Baker islands receive less than 1,000 mm of rain annually, with a March through June dry season. Rainfall on these islands is also more variable from year to year, with droughts during El Niño cycles.

Flora
Native vegetation on the wetter islands is principally tropical moist forest, with shrub and herbaceous plant communities in rocky areas and shoreline areas exposed to salt spray. Characteristic canopy trees include Pisonia grandis up to 25 meters high, Cordia subcordata, and Tournefortia argentea in single-species or mixed stands, with Calophyllum inophyllum, Pandanus tectorius, Hernandia nymphaeifolia, Ficus tinctoria, and Guettarda speciosa. Understory plants include the shrubs Suriana maritima and Pemphis acidula, the fern Asplenium nidus, and the vine Ipomoea tuba. Forests are interspersed with areas of Scaevola taccada and Morinda citrifolia scrub.

The drier islands are covered with low plants, including sparse grassland dominated by Lepturus repens, the creepers Portulaca spp., Sida fallax, and Sesuvium portulacastrum, the grass Eragrostis whitneyi, and occasionally the shrubs Cordia subcordata, Abutilon asiaticum, Suriana maritima, Pemphis acidula, and Tribulus cistoides.

The flora is mostly of widespread coastal Indo-Pacific species, with relatively few endemic species.

Fauna
The native vertebrates are mostly seabirds, who roost in large numbers on many of the islands. The only forest birds are the Pacific pigeon (Ducula pacifica), a year-round resident, and the migratory long-tailed cuckoo (Urodynamis taitensis), which winters in the tropical Pacific and breeds in New Zealand during the spring and summer. There are no native non-marine mammals or amphibians.

Polynesian rat (Rattus exulans) and house cats have been introduced to several islands, and prey heavily on native birds. Banded rails (Hypotaenidia philippensis) from Fiji have recently colonized Niulakita in Tuvalu.

Protected areas
64.3% of the ecoregion is in protected areas. Protected areas include the Phoenix Islands Protected Area.

References

External links

 Western Polynesian tropical moist forests (DOPA)
 Western Polynesian tropical moist forests (Encyclopedia of Earth)

Ecoregions of Kiribati
Ecoregions of the United States
Biota of Tuvalu
Environment of Tuvalu
Geography of Tuvalu
Oceanian ecoregions
Tropical and subtropical moist broadleaf forests
Ecoregions of American Samoa